The 1910 Buchtel football team represented Buchtel College in the 1910 college football season. The team was led by head coach Frank Haggerty, in his first season. Buchtel outscored their opponents by a total of 136–83.

Schedule

References

Buchtel
Akron Zips football seasons
Buchtel football